Jo-Anne, Jo Anne, Jo-Ann, JoAnn, JoAnne, and Jo Ann (all variants of Joanne) is a feminine given name. Notable persons with that name include:

Jo Ann Algermissen (1942–2009), American novelist
Joann Ariola (born 1958), American politician
JoAnne S. Bass, first female senior enlisted service member of any U.S. military branch
Jo-Anne Baird, English educational theorist
Jo Anne B. Barnhart (born 1950), American social security official
Jo-Anne Beaumier, Lebanese footballer
Jo Ann Campbell (born 1938), American singer
Jo-Anne L. Coe (1933–2002), American politician
Jo Ann Davis (1950–2007), American politician
Jo-Anne Dobson (born 1966), Northern-Irish politician
Jo Ann Emerson (born 1950), American politician
JoAnn Falletta (born 1954), American conductor
Joann Formosa (born 1961), Australian Para-equestrian
Jo Ann M. Gora, American academic
Jo Ann Kelly (1944–1990), English singer and guitarist
Jo-Anne Knowles, English actress
Jo Anne Lyon (born 1940), American church leader
Jo-Anne Nadler, British journalist and author
Jo-Anne McArthur (born 1976),Canadian photojournalist, animal rights activist and author
Jo Ann Pflug (born 1940), American actress
Jo-Anne Richards, South African journalist and author
Jo Ann Sayers (1918–2011), American actress
Jo Ann Sprague (born 1931), American politician
Jo Anne Van Tilburg, American archaeologist
Jo Anne Worley (born 1937), American actress
Jo Ann Zimmerman (born 1936), American politician

See also
Joanne (given name)
Jo-Anna, given name